Caius Novac (born 17 August 1921, date of death unknown) was a Romanian football defender. On 21 November 1948 he played in the first ever CSCA București – Dinamo București derby.

International career
Novac made one appearance at international level for Romania, in a 4–0 away victory against Albania at the 1947 Balkan Cup.

Notes

References

External links
Caius Novac profile at Labtof.ro

1921 births
Year of death missing
Romanian footballers
Romania international footballers
Association football defenders
Liga I players
Liga II players
FC Carmen București players
FC Dinamo București players
Unirea Tricolor București players